Francis "Frank" Kisekka (born 22 December 1926) is a retired Ugandan amateur flyweight boxer. He competed in the 1960 Summer Olympics, where he lost in the first bout to Paolo Curcetti.

References

External links

  

1926 births
Possibly living people
Boxers at the 1960 Summer Olympics
Olympic boxers of Uganda
Ugandan male boxers
Flyweight boxers